Isle of the Dead may refer to:
 Isle of the Dead (mythology), a theme associated with pre-Christian Celtic mythology
 Isle of the Dead (Tasmania), is a cemetery on an island adjacent to Port Arthur, Tasmania
 Isle of the Dead (film), a 1945 horror film
 Isle of the Dead (Zelazny novel), a 1969 science fiction novel by Roger Zelazny
 Isle of the Dead (Rodda novel), a 2005 children's fantasy novel by Emily Rodda
 Isle of the Dead (painting), a symbolist painting by Arnold Böcklin
 Isle of the Dead (Rachmaninoff), a symphonic poem
 Isle of the Dead (video game), a 1993 video game

See also
 Island of the Dead (disambiguation)
 Isle aux Morts, Newfoundland, Canada